Vrelina (Serbian Cyrillic: Врелина; trans. Heat) is the third studio album from former Yugoslav and Serbian hard rock/heavy metal band Osvajači. It is the only album recorded with vocalist Nenad Jovanović.

Ballad "Tragovi" is a cover of Rainbow song "Rainbow Eyes" from their 1977 album Long Live Rock 'n' Roll.

Track listing
All songs were written by Dragan Urošević, except "Tragovi" by Ritchie Blackmore (music) and Nenad Jovanović (lyrics).

"Ona ima san" – 2:50
"Vrelina" – 4:11
"Još mnogo dana" – 3:41
"Minut ćutanja" – 3:45
"Gotova priča" - 3:24
"Lutati je najbolje što znam" – 3:54
"Ćutiš kao pre" – 3:09
"Samo ti" – 4:07
"Voz za Jumu" – 3:59
"Tragovi" – 5:12

Personnel
Nenad Jovanović - vocals
Dragan Urošević - guitar
Saša Popović - rhythm guitar
Saša Marković - bass guitar
Nenad Branković - drums

Guest musicians
Laza Ristovski - keyboards
Predrag Gajović - acoustic guitar
Saša Nestorović - acoustic guitar

References
 EX YU ROCK enciklopedija 1960-2006,  Janjatović Petar;  

Osvajači albums
1999 albums